The Port Jackson and Manly Steamship Company (PJ&MSC) was a publicly listed company that operated the Manly ferries in Sydney, Australia. After being taken over by Brambles Industries, the ferry service was eventually taken over by the State Government and is now part of Sydney Ferries.

The company is notable for coining the expression about Manly being "Seven miles from Sydney and a thousand miles from care" and for promoting development in the Manly and Pittwater / Broken Bay areas.

Formation
The history of the PJ&MSC is entwined with the history of Manly itself. Manly had been envisaged as a seaside resort by Henry Gilbert Smith in the 1850s.  Initially Smith had chartered a paddle steamer to Manly and other vessels visited on an ad hoc "excursion" basis. Smith built a wharf in 1855 and eventually acquired an interest in steamers himself and soon more regular services to Manly had commenced.
  
By 1873 Smith had sold the lease to the wharf and his share of the steamers to the operators of the ferries. The business was later acquired by John Randal Carey (who later founded the Sydney Daily Telegraph newspaper) in 1875 and together with three other businessmen formed the Port Jackson Steamship Company Limited on 23 January 1877.

By 1901 the PJ&MSC's shares were trading on the Sydney Stock Exchange.

After some disquiet about the level of fees being charged by the company (and having been encouraged by Manly Council which had advertised for an alternative provider) a group of Manly residents established a competitor company, the Manly Co-operative Steam Ferry Company, in 1893.

A period of intense price competition ensued that saw passenger numbers increase substantially.  This resulted in the Co-operative experiencing financial difficulties and in 1896 its service collapsed and was taken over by the Port Jackson Company.

In 1907 the company was re-incorporated as the Port Jackson and Manly Steamship Company Limited (reflecting the merger some years earlier and sensitivity to Manly residents).

Chairmen
John Woods (1896–1900)
John Randal Carey (1900–1902)
S. C. Sadler (1903–1904)
Archibald Howie (1904–1908)
J. J. Eyre (1908–1913)
Hunter McPherson (1913–1932)
Sir Archibald Howie (1932–1943)
Handel Norman Pope (1943–1950)
H. W. Knight (1950–1964)
R. W. G. Hoyle (1964–1972)

Operations: Manly

For many years, ferry was the main mode of transport connecting Manly and the Sydney central business district (Circular Quay). Sydney's growing population (including growth in the 1850s due to the gold rush) saw the demand for the ferry services increase.

During its life, the PJ&MSC operated a number of types of ferries including paddle steamers, double-ended ferries with a wheelhouse at each end, coal-fired and oil-fired steamers, diesel powered ferries and hydrofoils.  Some of the ferries even featured padded lounges and a wine bar. Among the many ferries were the Baragoola, Dee Why, Balgowlah and South Steyne.

Hydrofoils were introduced in 1965 to provide a high-speed service to Manly in an attempt to boost revenue. While they proved popular, their mechanical unreliability led to their demise (they were ultimately replaced by the JetCats in the early 1990s).

In addition to its ferries, the PJ&MSC built and operated other attractions to encourage patronage on its Manly run. One such feature was a large shark proof ocean swimming pool, enclosed by a boardwalk (built in 1931), extending from the wharf across to the western side of Manly Cove.
Adjacent to the pool was a bathing pavilion which housed a diving and harbour plunge pool, a dance hall and dining rooms. The pool was destroyed by a large storm in 1974.

Other attractions included the conversion of an old cargo wharf into an amusement pier (Manly Fun Pier), and the HNLMS K XII, a World War II-era submarine, previously operated by the Royal Netherlands Navy, and set up adjacent to the sea pool as a museum ship.

Relationship with Manly Council
During its life, the company had a complicated relationship with Manly Municipal Council. There were several disputes over various matters including the lease of the wharf, cost of fares and freight delivery.

In 1918, seven of the council's alderman who had accepted free ferry passes from the company were charged and found guilty by a magistrate of contravening the Local Government Act and disqualified to act as aldermen. As the council only had a total of nine alderman, there was a period the council did not have a quorum and therefore did not function. The convictions were overturned on appeal.

Operations: Pittwater / Hawkesbury River
In 1942 the PJ&MSC acquired Palm Beach business of WJ Goddard & Sons, including general stores, marine and ferry services.

The company soon acquired some new ferries and was operating services between Church Point, the Basin, Scotland Island, Brooklyn, Berowra, Bobbin Head and Patonga.

In 1943-44 the company purchased the Currawong estate (including the guest houses) at Little Mackerel Beach and the Narrabeen Ice Works.

In 1950, with the company facing financial difficulties, the Currawong estate was sold to the Labor Council of New South Wales and some of the Pittwater ferry services were also disposed of.

Decline and sale
Better roads (including the Warringah Freeway), the upgrading of the Spit Bridge in 1958 and the spread of cars generally translated into declining ferry patronage and profitability.

On 19 April 1972, the PJ&MSC was acquired by Brambles Industries. Brambles main interest in the business, was the 50% shareholding in Tidewater Port Jackson Marine, which operated six platform supply vessels. Following a threat by Brambles to reduce the Manly ferry services, the NSW Government arranged for the Public Transport Commission to take over the service as from 1 December 1974.

A few government restructures later, the former operations of the former PJ&MSC now are again privately operated by Harbour City Ferries (now Transdev Sydney Ferries) under the Sydney Ferries brand.

Fleet

See also
 List of Australian ferries
 List of Sydney Harbour ferries
 Timeline of Sydney Harbour ferries

References

Ferry companies of New South Wales
Ferry transport in Sydney
Manly, New South Wales
Maritime history of Australia
Transport companies disestablished in 1974
1974 disestablishments in Australia